Yemashi (Yamaş) is a rural locality (a selo) and the administrative centre of Yemashinsky Selsoviet, Belokataysky District, Bashkortostan, Russia. The population was 1,025 as of 2010. There are 13 streets.

Geography 
Yemashi is located 47 km northwest of Novobelokatay (the district's administrative centre) by road. Nogushi is the nearest rural locality.

References 

Rural localities in Belokataysky District
Ufa Governorate